St. Michael's Alternative High School is a private Catholic high school located in Windsor, Ontario. St. Michaels is administered by the Windsor-Essex Catholic District School Board. In addition to the Windsor location, St. Michael's has additional locations in Essex, Ontario and a second location in Windsor for adult learning.

See also
List of high schools in Ontario

References

External links
Official site

Windsor-Essex Catholic District School Board
High schools in Windsor, Ontario
Educational institutions in Canada with year of establishment missing